Celiac (or coeliac in British English) may refer to:
 Coeliac disease
 Celiac artery
 Celiac lymph nodes
 Celiac plexus